So Soon We Change is a 1979 album from Temptations singer David Ruffin.  It was his first album for Warner Bros. Records after years of being with Motown.

Track listing

Side One
"Let Your Love Rain Down on Me" (Charles McCollough, Joe Shamwell, Tommy Tate)
"Break My Heart" (David Garner)
"I Get Excited" (Steven Hairston)
"Chain on the Brain" (Tony Hester)

Side Two
"Morning Sun Looks Blue" (Michael Amitin)
"Let's Stay Together" (Don Davis, Duane Freeman)
"So Soon We Change" (James Dean, John Glover)
"Sexy Dancer" (Don Davis, Elwin Rutledge)

Personnel
David Ruffin - vocals
Bruce Nazarian, Dennis Coffey, Norman Warner, Robert Troy - guitar
Anthony Willis, Steven Hairston - bass
Arnold Ingram, Michael Amitin, Ruby Robinson - keyboards
Jerry Jones - drums
Larry Fratangelo - percussion
Mike Iacopelli - ARP syndrum
Sam Peake - saxophone
Terry Harrington - alto saxophone
Patrick Adams - string and horn arrangements

Chart history

Singles

References

Warner Records albums
1979 albums
Albums produced by Don Davis (record producer)
David Ruffin albums
Albums recorded at A&M Studios